Pontianus was a sixth-century Christian bishop from an African diocese (not known), who was a figure in the Three-Chapter Controversy.

He wrote a critical letter to Emperor Justinian in 544–5,in reply to a request for his signature to an edict of condemnation. In it he asks Justinian to withdraw the anathematization of Theodore of Mopsuestia and other Monothelites involved in the matter of the Three Chapters. This letter is extant. He argues that the condemned writings were not known to him, and that dead men shouldn't be damned by the living, which is God's prerogative; in this he ignored precedents for posthumous condemnation. He also argues that the outcome of the Council of Chalcedon of 451, against Eutychianism, should not be undermined.

References
William Smith and Hery Wace, A Dictionary of Christian Biography, Literature, Sects and Doctrines (1887), vol.IV-1, article p. 438.

Notes

6th-century Byzantine bishops
6th-century Byzantine writers
6th-century Latin writers